The ISO 14064 standard (initially published in 2006 and updated in 2018) is part of the ISO 14000 series of International Standards for environmental management. The ISO 14064 standard provides governments, businesses, regions and other organisations with a complementary set of tools for programs to quantify, monitor, report and verify greenhouse gas emissions. The ISO 14064 standard supports organisations to participate in both regulated and voluntary programs such as emissions trading schemes and public reporting using a globally recognised standard.

Structure of Standard

The Standard is published in three parts:
 ISO 14064-1:2018 specifies principles and requirements at the organization level for quantification and reporting of greenhouse gas (GHG) emissions and removals. It includes requirements for the design, development, management, reporting and verification of an organization's GHG inventory.
 ISO 14064-2:2019 specifies principles and requirements and provides guidance at the project level for quantification, monitoring and reporting of activities intended to cause greenhouse gas (GHG) emission reductions or removal enhancements. It includes requirements for planning a GHG project, identifying and selecting GHG sources, sinks and reservoirs relevant to the project and baseline scenario, monitoring, quantifying, documenting and reporting GHG project performance and managing data quality.
 ISO 14064-3:2019 specifies principles and requirements and provides guidance for those conducting or managing the validation and/or verification of greenhouse gas (GHG) assertions. It can be applied to organizational or GHG project quantification, including GHG quantification, monitoring and reporting carried out in accordance with ISO 14064-1 or ISO 14064-2.

Uses 
ISO 14064-3 specifies requirements for selecting GHG validators/verifiers, establishing the level of assurance, objectives, criteria and scope, determining the validation/verification approach, assessing GHG data, information, information systems and controls, evaluating GHG assertions and preparing validation/verification statements.  

The ISO 14064-3 verification standard is one of the standards accepted by the Carbon Disclosure Project, the widely used climate impact disclosure system, as a valid framework for measuring and reporting GHG emissions.

The principles behind ISO 14064 have been used in national calculation methodologies such as the UK's Carbon Trust Standard.

History 
The standards were updated in 2018 from their initial versions published in 2006.

References

External links
ISO website detailing standard

14064